The New Moon is a 1919 silent film adventure drama directed by Chester Withey and produced by and starring Norma Talmadge, with Pedro de Cordoba and Charles K. Gerrard.

Plot

Princess Maria Pavlovna (Norma Talmadge) is at a grand ball in the palace of the Pavlovnas, given in honor of her engagement to Prince Michail Koloyar (Pedro de Cordoba). Marie reveals a democratic side in her kind treatment of the peasants, and is beloved by them.

In the midst of the gaiety, a Bolshevik mob led by Orel Kosloff (Stuart Holmes) invades the palace to ruthlessly kill and plunder, leaving the palace in ruins. Kosloff is actually a tool of an uninvited guest, Theo Kameneff (Charles Gerard), who is only a pretend Red, being paid by a foreign government to ruin Russia. The Prince makes one gallant fight after another to save Marie, and finally succeeds in sending her away in a carriage, but loses track of her as he makes his own escape.

Disguising himself as a peasant courier, who is a Red, with access to military centers, he searches for her.  Michail is caught and ordered to be shot, but he escapes. She, meanwhile, using her jewels, manages to purchase a grocery store in the village of Volsk, to provide a hideout. She creates the peasant identity of Sonia Sazonoff to run the store as its shopkeeper.

By accident, Marie is discovered by the unscrupulous Kameneff, who is now in love with her, though he is unknown to her. He issues a mandate that all females between 17 and 32 must register, and Marie does so under her assumed name, supposing it is for good work.

The women are undeceived when they find a second mandate makes them national property at the disposal of men. They appeal to Marie at a moment when Kameneff is within hearing. She says she will make an appeal to Kameneff.

Once she is alone with him, he reveals his identity and offers to revoke the order if she will live under his protection. With indomitable spirit, she denies him. Instead, she secretly helps women escape to the border. An orgy of brutality follows. Kosloff rapes potter Vasili Lazoff's (Marc McDermott) daughter. Marie locks Kameneff's sister, Nadia Kameneff (Marguerite Clayton), in a room to keep her away from one of his lustful henchmen. He tries to break open the door with an ax, and Marie grabs a large whip and beats him. He throws the ax, missing her face by inches. He then wrestles her to the floor before being driven off by an ax-wielding Lazoff.  Marie is caught aiding women to escape and becomes a candidate for execution. She is arrested and taken to Kameneff's headquarters. Lazoff becomes an instrument of vengeance and chokes the brutal Kosloff to death. Kameneff, meanwhile, has executed a group of women, including his own sister. Michail, despite being told that Marie is Kameneff's mistress, goes to her rescue, and reads her innocence in her eyes. Lazoff holds the pistol that Kameneff uses to commit suicide. Michail and Marie escape across the border, to enjoy new freedom and true happiness, though betrothed under the unlucky full moon (sic, confusing full moon with new moon; but, in the film, only a crescent moon is shown.)
[Source: adapted and compiled from various sources at https://web.stanford.edu/~gdegroat/NT/oldreviews/nm.htm#variety, with additional information from Janiss Garza at https://www.allmovie.com/movie/v103825]

Cast
 Norma Talmadge - Princess Marie Pavlovna
 Pedro de Cordoba - Prince Michail Koloyar
 Charles K. Gerrard - Theo Kameneff
 Stuart Holmes - Orel Kosloff
 Marc McDermott - Vasili Lazoff
 Ethel Kaye - Masha Lazoff
 Harry Sothern - Leo Pushkin
 Marguerite Clayton - Nadia Kameneff
 Mathilde Brundage -

Preservation status
The film is preserved incomplete (1 reel missing) in the Library of Congress Packard Campus for Audio-Visual Conservation collection.

Gallery

References

External links

 
 
 
 
 lantern slide  ...( retrieved from Wayback Machine)

1919 films
American silent feature films
American black-and-white films
Films directed by Chester Withey
American adventure drama films
1910s adventure drama films
Selznick Pictures films
1919 drama films
1910s American films
Silent American drama films
Silent adventure drama films
1910s English-language films